Tarari Assembly constituency (formerly Piro Assembly constituency) is one of 243 constituencies of legislative assembly of Bihar. It is part of Arrah Lok Sabha constituency along with other assembly constituencies viz. Barhara, Arrah, Sandesh, Jagdishpur, Shahpur and Agiaon (SC).

Area/ Wards
Tarari assembly constituency consists of:

 Tarari CD block
 Sahar CD block 
 Gram Panchayats: Amai, Bachari, Bharsar, Nonar, Katar, Narayanpur, Sukhrauli and Piro (Nagar Panchayat) of Piro CD block.

Members of the Legislative Assembly
The list of the Members of the Legislative Assembly (MLA) representing Tarari constituency is as follows:

Election results

2020

References

External links
 

Politics of Bhojpur district, India
Assembly constituencies of Bihar